Bud! The Amazing Bud Powell (Vol. 3), also known as The Amazing Bud Powell, Vol. 3: Bud!, is a studio album by jazz pianist Bud Powell, released on Blue Note in 1957, featuring a session Powell recorded at the Rudy Van Gelder Studio in Hackensack, New Jersey on August 3, 1957, with Paul Chambers on bass and Art Taylor on drums, and trombonist Curtis Fuller guesting on three tracks.

The album was digitally remastered in 2001 by Rudy Van Gelder and re-issued in January, 2002 as part of Blue Note's The RVG Edition series. The version of the album included on the third disc of The Complete Blue Note and Roost Recordings, a 4 disc box set, is that from the first CD release in 1989.

Track listing 2001 CD The RVG Edition 
Except where otherwise noted, all songs composed by Bud Powell.
 "Some Soul" – 6:56
 "Blue Pearl" – 3:46
 "Frantic Fancies" – 4:50
 "Bud on Bach" – 2:30
 "Keepin' in the Groove" – 2:53
 "Idaho" (Jesse Stone) – 5:14
 "Don't Blame Me" (Jimmy McHugh, Dorothy Fields) – 7:31
 "Moose the Mooche" (Charlie Parker) – 5:45
 "Blue Pearl" (alternate take) – 4:03

Personnel

Performance 
 Bud Powell – piano (all)
 Curtis Fuller – trombone (tracks 6-8)
 Paul Chambers – bass (all except track 4)
 Art Taylor – drums (all except track 4)

Production 
 Bob Blumenthal – liner notes
 Michael Boland - art direction and design
 Michael Cuscuna – producer
 Leonard Feather – liner notes
 Gordan H. Jee - creative direction
 Alfred Lion – producer, original session producer
 Reid Miles – cover design
 Rudy Van Gelder – recording engineer, mastering
 Francis Wolff – photography, cover photo

Release history 
The album was first released in 1957 as a 12" LP. In 1989, the album was digitally remastered and released on CD with an extra alternate take of "Blue Pearl", and with the tracks listed in session chronological order. In 2001, Rudy Van Gelder remastered the album from scratch, and the album was re-issued as part of Blue Note's The RVG Edition series. The track listing was changed back to the original LP order, with the alternate take of "Blue Pearl" following.

1957 12" LP (BLP 1571) 
 "Some Soul" – 6:56
 "Blue Pearl" – 3:46
 "Frantic Fancies" – 4:50
 "Bud On Bach" – 2:30
 "Keepin' In The Groove" – 2:53

 "Idaho" (Stone) – 5:14
 "Don't Blame Me" (McHugh, Fields) – 7:31
 "Moose the Mooche" (Parker) – 5:45

1989 CD 
 "Blue Pearl" – 3:46
 "Blue Pearl" (alternate take) – 4:03
 "Keepin' In The Groove" – 2:53
 "Some Soul" – 6:56
 "Frantic Fancies" – 4:50
 "Bud On Bach" – 2:30
 "Idaho" (Stone) – 5:14
 "Don't Blame Me" (McHugh, Fields) – 7:31
 "Moose the Mooche" (Parker) – 5:45

References 

 Blue Note BLP 1571
 Bud Powell at jazzdisco.org
 Bud!,... at BlueNote.com

Bud Powell albums
1957 albums
Albums produced by Alfred Lion
Blue Note Records albums
Albums recorded at Van Gelder Studio
Albums produced by Michael Cuscuna
Albums with cover art by Reid Miles
Sequel albums